Henri Baillot (13 December 1924 – 9 November 2000) was a French footballer. He played in eight matches for the France national football team from 1948 to 1950. He was also named in France's squad for the Group 3 qualification tournament for the 1950 FIFA World Cup.

References

External links
 
 

1924 births
2000 deaths
French footballers
France international footballers
Place of birth missing
Association football forwards
FC Metz players
FC Girondins de Bordeaux players
RC Strasbourg Alsace players
Stade Rennais F.C. players
Ligue 1 players
Ligue 2 players